Team Manzana Postobón  was a Continental cycling team based in Colombia that participates in UCI Continental Circuits races. The team was founded in 2006, becoming a Continental team in 2007. It became a Professional Continental team in 2011 as Colombia es Pasión-Café de Colombia, however with the set up of the European-based Colombia–Coldeportes outfit the team went back to Continental level.

In 2016 the team had quality to finally jump up to the Pro Continental level for 2017, the first Colombian professional team in that level since Team Colombia cycling team in 2015.

On May 25, 2019, the team announced that it would fold with immediate effect after two doping cases had been announced.

Doping
In April 2019 the team terminated Wilmar Paredes’ contract after the UCI announced that he had tested positive for EPO.

In May 2019 Juan José Amador notified of an adverse analytical finding for the banned steroid, Boldenone an out-of-competition control held on 22 October 2018. According to UCI anti-doping regulation 7.12.1, the team will now be suspended for a period of between 15 and 45 days, to be decided by the UCI Disciplinary Commission, due to the team registering a second adverse analytical finding within a 12-month period.

Final team roster

Major wins 

2007
Stage 5 Ronde de l'Isard, Oscar Sanchez
 Overall Clásico Ciclístico Banfoandes, Sergio Luis Henao
Stage 4 & 6, Sergio Luis Henao
Stage 3 Vuelta a Guatemala, Jairo Salas
2008
Stage 6 Vuelta a Colombia, Rafael Montiel
Stage 12 Vuelta a Colombia, Wilson Marentes
Stage 4 Vuelta a Guatemala, Jesus Castaño
Stage 5 Vuelta a Guatemala, Jeffry Romero
2009
 Overall Cinturón a Mallorca, Sergio Luis Henao
Stage 4, Sergio Luis Henao
Stage 3 Vuelta a Colombia, Fabio Duarte
 Overall Tour des Pyrénées, Fabio Duarte
Stage 2 Fabio Duarte
2010
Stage 4 Vuelta a Asturias, Fabio Duarte
 Overall Circuito Montañés, Fabio Duarte
Stage 4, Fabio Duarte
Stage 5 & 12 Vuelta a Colombia, Fabio Duarte
Stage 6 Vuelta a Colombia, Luis Felipe Laverde
2011
Stage 7 Vuelta a Colombia, Jarlinson Pantano
2013
 Overall Ronde de l'Isard, Juan Ernesto Chamorro
Stage 3, Heiner Parra
Stage 4 Vuelta al Sur de Bolivia, Camilo Suárez
Stage 5 Vuelta al Sur de Bolivia, Edson Calderón
2014
 Overall Vuelta Mexico Telmex, Juan Pablo Villegas
Stages 1, 4 & 5 (ITT), Juan Pablo Villegas
Stage 3, Diego Ochoa
 National U23 Road Race Championships, Diego Ochoa
 Overall Giro della Valle d'Aosta, Bernardo Suaza
Prologue, Diego Ochoa
2016
Stage 1 Vuelta a la Comunidad de Madrid, Juan Sebastián Molano
Stage 4 Vuelta a Colombia, Juan Sebastián Molano
2017
Stages 3 & 5 Volta ao Alentejo, Juan Sebastián Molano
Stage 2 Vuelta a Colombia, Wilmar Paredes
Stage 12 Vuelta a Colombia, Juan Pablo Villegas
2018
Pan American Cycling Championships Road Race, Juan Sebastián Molano
 Overall Tour of Qinghai Lake, Hernán Aguirre
Stages 4 & 6, Hernán Aguirre
Stage 2 & 3 Tour of Xingtai, Juan Sebastián Molano
 Overall Tour of China I, Juan Sebastián Molano
Stage 2, Juan Sebastián Molano
Stage 1 Tour of China II, Juan Sebastián Molano
Stages 1 & 2 Tour of Taihu Lake, Juan Sebastián Molano
Stages 6 Tour of Taihu Lake, Jordan Parra 
2019 
Stage 1 Tour de Taiwan, Bryan Gómez 
Stage 1 Vuelta a Asturias, Carlos Quintero

National champions 

2014
 Colombian U23 Road Race Championship, Diego Ochoa

References

External links

Cycling teams based in Colombia
Cycling teams established in 2006
UCI Professional Continental teams
UCI Continental Teams (America)